Kloten, Wisconsin is an unincorporated community in the town of Stockbridge in Calumet County, Wisconsin, United States.

Kloten is named after Kloten, Switzerland.

Notable people

 Ty Bodden, Wisconsin legislator

Images

Notes

Unincorporated communities in Wisconsin
Unincorporated communities in Calumet County, Wisconsin